User experience design (UX design, UXD, UED, or XD) is the process of defining the experience a user would go through when interacting with a company, its services, and its products. Design decisions in UX design are often driven by research, data analysis, and test results rather than aesthetic preferences and opinions. Unlike user interface design, which focuses solely on the design of a computer interface, UX design encompasses all aspects of a user's perceived experience with a product or website, such as its usability, usefulness, desirability, brand perception, and overall performance. UX design is also an element of the customer experience (CX), which encompasses all aspects and stages of a customer's experience and interaction with a company.

History
The field of user experience design is a conceptual design discipline and has its roots in human factors and ergonomics, a field that, since the late 1940s, has focused on the interaction between human users, machines, and the contextual environments to design systems that address the user's experience. With the proliferation of workplace computers in the early 1990s, user experience started to become a positive insight for designers. Donald Norman, a professor and researcher in design, usability, and cognitive science, coined the term "user experience," and brought it to a wider audience.  

There is a debate occurring in the experience design community regarding its focus, provoked in part by design scholar and practitioner, Don Norman. Norman claims that when designers describe people only as customers, consumers, and users, designers risk diminishing their ability to do good design.

Elements

Research

User experience design draws from design approaches like human-computer interaction and user-centered design, and includes elements from similar disciplines like interaction design, visual design, information architecture, user research, and others.

The second part of the research is understanding the end-user and the purpose of the application. Though this might seem clear to the designer, stepping back and empathizing with the user will yield the best results.

It helps to identify and prove or disprove my assumptions, find commonalities across target audience members, and recognize their needs, goals, and mental models.

Visual design
Visual design, also commonly known as graphic design, user interface design, communication design, and visual communication, represents the aesthetics or look-and-feel of the front end of any user interface.  Graphic treatment of interface elements is often perceived as the visual design.  The purpose of visual design is to use visual elements like colors, images, and symbols to convey a message to its audience. Fundamentals of Gestalt psychology and visual perception give a cognitive perspective on how to create effective visual communication.

Information architecture

Information architecture is the art and science of structuring and organizing the information in products and services to support usability and findability.

In the context of information architecture, information is separate from both knowledge and data, and lies nebulously between them. It is information about objects. The objects can range from websites, to software applications, to images et al. It is also concerned with metadata: terms used to describe and represent content objects such as documents, people, process, and organizations. Information architecture also encompasses how the pages and navigation are structured.

Interaction design

It is well recognized that the component of interaction design is an essential part of user experience (UX) design, centering on the interaction between users and products. The goal of interaction design is to create a product that produces an efficient and delightful end-user experience by enabling users to achieve their objectives in the best way possible

The current high emphasis on user-centered design and the strong focus on enhancing user experience have made interaction designers critical in conceptualizing products to match user expectations and meet the standards of the latest UI patterns and components.

In the last few years, the role of interaction designer has shifted from being just focused on specifying UI components and communicating them to the engineers to a situation in which designers have more freedom to design contextual interfaces based on helping meet the user's needs.  Therefore, User Experience Design evolved into a multidisciplinary design branch that involves multiple technical aspects from motion graphics design and animation to programming.

Usability

Usability is the extent to which a product can be used by specified users to achieve specified goals with effectiveness, efficiency and satisfaction in a specified context of use.

Usability is attached to all tools used by humans and is extended to both digital and non-digital devices. Thus, it is a subset of user experience but not wholly contained. The section of usability that intersects with user experience design is related to humans' ability to use a system or application. Good usability is essential to positive user experience but does not alone guarantee it.

Accessibility

Accessibility of a system describes its ease of reach, use, and understanding. In terms of user experience design, it can also be related to the overall comprehensibility of the information and features.  It helps shorten the learning curve associated with the system. Accessibility in many contexts can be related to the ease of use for people with disabilities and comes under usability. In addition, accessible design is the concept of services, products, or facilities in which designers should accommodate and consider for the needs of people with disabilities. According to the Web Content Accessibility Guidelines (WCAG), all content must follow by the four main principles of POUR: Perceivable, Operable, Understandable and Robust.

WCAG compliance 

Web Content Accessibility Guidelines (WCAG) 2.0 covers a wide range of recommendations for making Web content more accessible. This makes web content more usable to users in general. Making content more usable and readily accessible to all types of users enhances a user's overall user experience.

Human–computer interaction

Human–computer interaction is concerned with the design, evaluation and implementation of interactive computing systems for human use and with the study of major phenomena surrounding them.

Getting ready to design
After research, the designer uses the modeling of the users and their environments. User modeling or personas are composite archetypes based on behavior patterns uncovered during research. Personas provide designers a precise way of thinking and communicating about how groups of users behave, how they think, what they want to accomplish and why. Once created, personas help the designer to understand the users' goals in specific contexts, which is particularly useful during ideation and for validating design concepts. Other types of models include workflow models, artifact models, and physical models.

Design
When the designer has a firm grasp on the user's needs and goals, they begin to sketch out the interaction framework (also known as wireframes). This stage defines the high-level structure of screen layouts, as well as the product's flow, behavior, and organization. There are many kinds of materials that can be involved during this iterative phase, from whiteboards to paper prototypes. As the interaction framework establishes an overall structure for product behavior, a parallel process focused on the visual and industrial designs. The visual design framework defines the experience attributes, visual language, and the visual style.

Once a solid and stable framework is established, wireframes are translated from sketched storyboards to full-resolution screens that depict the user interface at the pixel level. At this point, it is critical for the programming team to collaborate closely with the designer. Their input is necessary to create a finished design that can and will be built while remaining true to the concept.
 
Test and iterate
Usability testing is carried out by giving users various tasks to perform on the prototypes. Any issues or problems faced by the users are collected as field notes and these notes are used to make changes in the design and reiterate the testing phase. Aside from monitoring issues, questions asked by users are also noted in order to identify potential points of confusion. Usability testing is, at its core, a means to "evaluate, not create".

UX deliverables
UX designers perform a number of different tasks and therefore use a range of deliverables to communicate their design ideas and research findings to stakeholders.  Regarding UX specification documents, these requirements depend on the client or the organization involved in designing a product. The four major deliverables are: a title page, an introduction to the feature, wireframes, and a version history. Depending on the type of project, the specification documents can also include flow models, cultural models, personas, user stories, scenarios and any prior user research.

The deliverables that UX designers will produce as part of their job include wireframes, prototypes, user flow diagrams, specification and tech docs, websites and applications, mockups, presentations, personas, user profiles, videos, and to a lesser degree reports. Documenting design decisions, in the form of annotated wireframes, gives the developer the necessary information they may need to successfully code the project.

Follow-up to project launch
Requires:
 User testing/usability testing
 A/B testing
 Information architecture 
 Sitemaps and user flows
 Additional wireframing as a result of test results and fine-tuning

UX stakeholders 
A user experience designer is considered a UX practitioner, along with the following job titles: user experience researcher, information architect, interaction designer, human factors engineer, business analyst, consultant, creative director, interaction architect, and usability specialist.

Interaction designers 
Interaction designers (IxD) are responsible for understanding and specifying how the product should behave. This work overlaps with the work of both visual and industrial designers in a couple of important ways. When designing physical products, interaction designers must work with industrial designers early on to specify the requirements for physical inputs and to understand the behavioral impacts of the mechanisms behind them. Interaction designers cross paths with visual designers throughout the project. Visual designers guide the discussions of the brand and emotive aspects of the experience, Interaction designers communicate the priority of information, flow, and functionality in the interface.

Technical communicators 
Historically, technical and professional communication (TPC) has been as an industry that practices writing and communication. However, recently UX design has become more prominent in TPC as companies look to develop content for a wide range of audiences and experiences. It is now an expectation that technical and professional skills should be coupled with UX design. According to Verhulsdonck, Howard, and Tham, "...it is not enough to write good content. According to industry expectations, next to writing good content, it is now also crucial to design good experiences around that content." Technical communicators must now consider different platforms such as social media and apps, as well as different channels like web and mobile.

User interface designers 
User interface (UI) design is the process of making interfaces in software or computerized devices with a focus on looks or style. Designers aim to create designs users will find easy to use and pleasurable. UI design typically refers to graphical user interfaces but also includes others, such as voice-controlled ones.

Visual designers 
The visual designer ensures that the visual representation of the design effectively communicates the data and hints at the expected behavior of the product. At the same time, the visual designer is responsible for conveying the brand ideals in the product and for creating a positive first impression; this responsibility is shared with the industrial designer if the product involves hardware. In essence, a visual designer must aim for maximum usability combined with maximum desirability. Visual designer need not be good in artistic skills but must deliver the theme in a desirable manner.

User experience in video games 
Video games are run by user experience design tactics and are key in their success. User experience has improved in gaming by providing people with a higher picture and resolution quality. In the past, the original Nintendo gaming systems had very blurry and distorted graphics and did not provide users with clear on-screen graphical content. Users and game developers wanted more than just a distorted image to control in a 2D platform. With new desires to give gamers a better user experience and user interface, the creation of new 3D game designing came about. The addition of a 3D imagery systems gave designers new usability options and allowed players of 3D games to explore around a 3D virtual map, like in Mario Bros. This new 3D animation was just the spark that would light the fire for the advancement of graphical content to come and also resulted in more realistic and real-world oriented game imaging.

As more consoles are released the user interface of graphics greatly increases. Consoles such as PlayStation 4 and Xbox One are the latest next-generation consoles that portray realistic graphics that results in giving players a more exciting user experience. Games that include high level graphics are Grand Theft Auto V, NBA 2K19, and Madden NFL 19. In Madden and NBA users can play with their real-life favorite sports players that almost look exactly the same. The picture for the games even captures tattoos and certain distinct facial features found on videogame characters' real-life version.	Furthermore, storyline enhancements have resulted in the user interfaces of video games gaining popular feedback from fans and contribute to the achievement of the game as a whole. According to Robin Burks, "playing a video game involves more interaction than watching a film or television series. For example, scenes pause as players are forced to decide who lives and who dies: and sometimes, players must make that choice quickly. This interaction means that the player becomes part of the story and not just an inactive participant." The quick decision making and on edge approach to video game storylines impact the way players shape their own user experience. In some circumstances, users could be faced with choosing life or death between two of their favorite characters. For players who become emotionally invested in their games this spices things up for them and leaves them with a tough decision.

Testing the design

Usability testing is the most common method used by designers to test their designs. The basic idea behind conducting a usability test is to check whether the design of a product or brand works well with the target users. While carrying out usability testing, two things are being tested for: whether the design of the product is successful and if it is not successful, how can it be improved.

While designers are testing, they are testing the design and not the user. Also, every design is evolving. The designers carry out usability testing at every stage of the design process and as early and often as possible.

See also
 Action research
 Activity-centered design
 Attentive user interface
 Customer experience
 Design thinking
 Paper prototyping
 Participatory design
 Process-centered design
 User experience
 User experience evaluation

References

Further reading
 
 
 
 
 
 
 
 

Human–computer interaction
User interfaces
Design
Web design
Software development process